Our Lady of the Rosary of San Nicolás is, in Catholicism, a title of veneration of the Virgin Mary associated with a reported private revelation to Gladys Quiroga de Motta, a middle-aged housewife, beginning in the 1980s in the city of San Nicolás de los Arroyos, Argentina. Quiroga said that she was tasked with promoting devotion to the Mother of God under this title, with an emphasis on key passages in the Bible and a particular mystical stellar symbolism. The apparitions continue almost every day since 1983 and have been approved the catholic Church. Messages from 1983 to 1990 virgen san nicolas/consulta de mensajes.htm|Mensajes María del Rosario de SN 1983-1990 Español have been officially published and miracles, conversions and healings occur in the Sanctuary. María Del Rosario de San Nicolas is calling Catholics to pray one hour per day, daily eucharistic and conversion. She is the ark of the Covenant that leads us to back to God, by the Mercy and love of Christ to prepare us for His second coming that will also be based in love.

The devotional image, that of a standing Madonna offering rosary beads to the faithful, resembles that of Our Lady of Mount Carmel offering the scapular to St. Simon Stock, while differing from traditional Dominican Seat-of-Wisdom-type depictions of Our Lady of the Rosary popularized by the Order of Preachers.

The pilgrimage site, named in honor of Our Lady of the Rosary of San Nicolás erected in San Nicolás de los Arroyos, is one of the most important in Argentina.

History 
The parish church dedicated to St. Nicholas of Bari was inaugurated in 1884 and furnished with a statue of Our Lady donated by a member of the local Confraternity of the Rosary.

A century later, an Argentinian lay woman, Gladys Quiroga de Motta, reportedly received a number of private revelations from the Virgin Mary beginning on 25 September 1983, a date now commemorated as the feast of Our Lady of the Rosary of San Nicolás. Announced by unusually radiant, glowing rosary beads and followed by a number of brief visions, Gladys subsequently receives repeated visions beginning on October 13, the anniversary of apparitions at Fátima. Specific messages led to the discovery—and restoration to veneration—of a long-neglected statue of a Madonna carrying the Christ Child. Occurring at the close of the twentieth century, the messages mirror those given at the beginning of the twentieth century where the Virgin Mary reportedly identified herself as the Lady of the Rosary at Fátima in Portugal. Following approval of the spiritual merits by local religious authorities, a new church dedicated to Marian devotion under this title was erected as requested by Our Lady during the apparitions.

Chronology 

First apparitions: 
YEAR 1983
September 25: The Virgin Maria del Rosario de San Nicolas appears to Gladys Quiroga de Motta.
September 28: Second apparition.
October 7: Gladys asks the Virgin what she wants, and receives a vision of a chapel. 
October 12: Gladys entrusts herself to a priest, Reverend Fr. Carlos Pérez
October 13: The Virgin speaks to her for the first time.
Audience with the then diocesan bishop, Monsignor Antonio F. Rossi. 
November 15: Gladys receives the message: "I am Patroness of this region". "Assert My rights".
First message from Christ. In the future He will appear once a month with a message, which prologues the Virgin's message.
November 19: The Virgin makes Gladys know her mission: "You are a bridge of union", "Preach My Word".
November 24: A ray of light indicates to Gladys the location of the future Temple. She recognizes the apparition when she sees the image of the Virgin of the Rosary, relegated in the bell tower due to its deterioration. After searching in different city churches, she goes to the Cathedral of St. Nicholas of Bari, looking for an image that had previously been located there. In a storage attic, she recognises the image that appears to her in her apparitions: Our Lady of the Rosary. The statue had been blessed by Pope Leon XIII and put into storage because the right hand that would have held the Rosary had been broken off, and was in need of repair.The Virgin tells her: "I want to be on the banks of the Paraná".
 1884: inauguration of the parish church of St. Nicholas of Bari and donation of a statue of Our Lady of the Rosary. 
 1984 - July 19: founding of the Marian Movement of St Nicholas
 December 2: Message from Our Lady: "Gladys, have a medal struck in my image, invoking the title of Mary of the Rosary of St Nicholas and on the obverse, the Holy Trinity with seven stars."
 1985 - May 25: a multitude of pilgrims arrive in San Nicolás, mobilizing the city 
 June 13: 10,000 small books are printed with the messages of Our Lady of the Rosary of St Nicholas in Rosario, Santa Fe, the neighboring province and seat of the metropolitan Archbishop of the Archdiocese Rosario (metropolitan of the suffragan diocese of San Nicolás
 August 25: The municipal authorities of San Nicolás deed the land known as "el campito" (in English "little meadow" meaning a small raised patch of dry land amongst the wetland creeks known in Spanish as arroyas) to the Catholic Church for the building of a new place of worship
 September 25: in a message from Our Lady, she explains to Gladys Motta the significance of symbolism of the seven stars: they are the seven graces that her son Jesus Christ will grant whomever carries the medal on their chest.
 October 25: the inauguration of a hostel for pilgrims and a center for the promotion of Marian devotion under the title Virgen de Rosario de San Nicolas de los Arroyos 
 1987: by June of that year, 2.3 million copies of images of the statue of Our Lady had been disseminated
 April 5: Monsignor Castagna greets Pope John Paul II during a papal visit to Argentina
 October 8: contract signed with the construction company for the new Sanctuary, Gerlach & Campbell
 1990 - April 2: worldwide pilgrimage of 60,000 priests from all parts of the globe.

Pilgrimages

Every September 25, the city of San Nicolás hosts hundreds of thousands of pilgrims and faithful who meet to venerate and honor the statue of Our Lady of the Rosary of St Nicholas. In 2003, on the twentieth anniversary of the first alleged apparition of Our Lady, the second largest group ever congregated: 400,000 faithful. Pilgrims came from all the provinces of Argentina, with a group of more than 1,000 people from Buenos Aires who traveled the whole 240 km distance on foot: a distance three times greater than that from Buenos Aires to the national Basilica of Our Lady of Luján. On 25 September 2013, thirty years after the first apparition of Our Lady, 500.000 people gathered surpassing the record of 2003.

The Sanctuary 

The Marian shrine was built according to plans to accommodate 8,000 to 9,000 people standing within the ground floor and special mezzanines. Additional terraces and esplanades were built to accommodate greater numbers at outdoor events.

The 24-meter diameter dome (exterior 27 meters), comprising a vertical arrangement of 64 sections of reinforced concrete faced on the exterior with copper plating, is visible from many locations in the city. Construction in currently 70% complete.

On 25 May 2014 the interior of the Sanctuary was inaugurated in its entirety.

Publications
In August 1990, the French theologian René Laurentin, an expert in Marian devotions, published the results of his study of the apparitions in over 163 pages produced during his visit to the city. He acknowledged a collaboration with Monsignor Domingo Salvador Castagna|es, Marie Helene Sutter de Gall, and Father Carlos Pérez, the priest in whom Gladys Motta confided her spiritual experiences.

In 1994, the historian Cayetano Bruno|es from the nearby city of Rosario seat of the Archbishop Metropolitan of the suffragan diocese of San Nicolás published his "History of the Manifestations of Our Lady of the Rosary of St Nicholas" compiled from testimonies and official records kept in the archives of the Sanctuary.

A 1990 book titled "Messages" records a compendium of the messages in the words of the visionary Gladys Motta as received during apparitions since 1987. In 1991 Victor Martinez published his book titled "Who is this woman?"

Approval by the Roman Catholic Church 

In a decree signed on 22 May 2016 and made public a few days later, Héctor Cardelli, Bishop of the Diocese of San Nicolás, declared that the apparitions that took place in city of San Nicolás were supernatural in origin.

See also 
 Marian devotions
 Veneration of Mary in the Catholic Church
 Other Titles of Mary in Latin America
 Other Shrines to the Virgin Mary in Argentina
 Marian art in the Catholic Church
 Roman Catholic Mariology

References 
Primary Sources
 Diario "El Norte". San Nicolás de los Arroyos. 250 años. ("St Nicholas of the Arroyos. 250 years") - a history of the city, published in Spanish by Ediciones Diario El Norte, 1998 (392 pages). 
 Diario "Clarín". Argentina Pueblo a Pueblo ("Argentina, from settlement to settlement") published in Spanish by Tomo 6. Buenos Aires, AGEA AGATA UTE, 2006 (160 pages) 

Secondary Sources

External links 
 "Message of Our Lady of San Nicolas" multimedia website of the Center for Promoting Marian Devotion at the Sanctuary of Our Lady of the Rosary of San Nicolás

Marian devotions
Titles of Mary
Rosary